Sweetbox is the debut album of Sweetbox. It was the first and only album to have Tina Harris on vocals, and the last to have a R&B urban main influence, as Jade Villalon took over on vocals on Classified and changed the sound of Sweetbox to classical infused pop. The album, Sweetbox, was first released in January 1998 in Germany and released throughout the year in continental Europe and Asia. In North America, the album was released in September 1998 and titled Everything's Gonna Be Alright, adding newly recorded songs. In Japan, the album was reissued in that same year including two new songs which were released as singles: "Sometimes" and a Tears For Fears cover of their hit "Shout. The album reached double platinum and triple gold status in Japan and sold well in Asia but was not a big seller in Europe and America, despite having a worldwide hit single.

The most famous single from this album, "Everything's Gonna Be Alright" (based on J. S. Bach's passage Air, taken from Suite No. 3 in D major, BWV 1068) claimed top ten chart positions in France, UK, Italy, Spain, Ireland, Sweden, Austria, Switzerland, Belgium, Norway, Finland, Colombia, Lebanon and Israel. The track also stayed for 10 weeks #1 of the World Radio Charts (which is compiled of 150 radio stations in 40 countries).

Track listing

Credits
Produced by GEO. 
Published by Edition Parasongs/EMI Music Publishing except for 'If I Can't Have You' published by UFA Musikverlage.
Mastered by Bernie Grundman, Hollywood, CA (USA). 
Executive producer: Heiko Schmidt.

Samples
"Everything's Gonna Be Alright" samples 'Air on a G String (Suite No.3)'  from J.S Bach
"Don't Go Away" samples 'Adagio in G minor'  from Tomaso Albinoni

Charts

Certifications

References

1998 debut albums
Sweetbox albums